Uncle Peckerhead is a 2020 comedy-horror film written and directed by Matthew John Lawrence.

Plot
The members of the band Duh (Judy, Max, and Mel) have all quit their jobs and are ready to embark on their first tour. The first roadblock on their journey is the fact that their van was repossessed. Desperate for a vehicle, the band placed flyers on every van in town asking to use it for their tour. One van is occupied by one Uncle Peckerhead (or "Peck" as he is known to his friends) who offers to drive the band and be their roadie. However, it turns out that Peck turns into a man-eating monster for thirteen minutes every night at midnight.

Cast
 David Littleton - Peckerhead
 Chet Siegel - Judy
 Jeff Riddle - Max
 Ruby McCollister - Mel
Shannon O'Neill - Jen Jennings
 Ryan Conrath - Shiloh

Reception
The film is rated  at Rotten Tomatoes with  reviews. Bloody Disgusting gave it four out of five skulls and called it "laugh-out-loud funny and gruesomely gory." Rue Morgue praised the film and called it "a love letter to the punk-indie aesthetic." The A.V. Club called the film "a Z-movie that is so good-naturedly stupid, it slowly wins you over through sheer fey likability."

References

External links
 
 

2020 films
2020 comedy horror films
American comedy horror films
2020 independent films
American independent films
2020s English-language films
Films about music and musicians
2020s American films